York North was a federal riding in Ontario, Canada, that was in the House of Commons of Canada from Confederation in 1867 until 2004.

The federal riding was eliminated in 2003 when it was redistributed between two new ridings of Newmarket—Aurora and York—Simcoe. Another small section was incorporated into Oak Ridges—Markham. The riding covered the northern suburbs of the city of Toronto often including such towns as Aurora, Vaughan, Newmarket, Richmond Hill and Markham. The borders changed often, however, most notably in 1996 when the riding was so altered that it contained very little of the same territory as before.

Evolution of the riding

The British North America Act, 1867 designated the electoral districts to be used in elected the members of the House of Commons. By virtue of the size of its population, the County of York was divided into a number of ridings, instead of being allocated one seat in the House of Commons like many other counties. The initial boundaries of the North Riding of York were defined in 1859 to consist of the Township of King, Whitchurch, Georgina, East Gwillimbury and North Gwillimbury, and the villages of Aurora, Newmarket and Holland Landing. Over time, the boundaries were adjusted as the City of Toronto expanded, and as the population of the area grew.

In 1882, the riding was redefined to consist of the townships of King, East Gwillimbury, West Gwillimbury, North Gwillimbury and Georgina, and the villages of Holland Landing, Bradford and Aurora.

In 1903, the north riding was redefined to consist of the townships of Georgina, East Gwillimbury, North Gwillimbury, King, and Whitchurch, the towns of Aurora and Newmarket, and the villages of Holland Landing, Stouffville and Sutton.

In 1924, York North was defined as consisting of all that part of the county of York north of the southerly boundary of the townships of Vaughan and Markham. In 1933, its  boundary was the townships of North York and Whitchurch, excluding the village of Stouffville. In 1947, it was redefined to consist of that part of the county of York lying north of the line being the southerly boundary of the township of North York, Yonge Street and the southerly boundary of the township of Markham.

In 1952, it was defined as consisting of that part of the county of York lying north of Highway 7, excluding the town of Woodbridge.

In 1966, it was defined as consisting of a north-central section of the Borough of North York in Metropolitan Toronto, the Town of Richmond Hill, the Township of Markham excluding the Village of Stouffville, and part of the Township of Vaughan.

In 1976, it was redefined to consist of the Towns of Markham, Richmond Hill and Vaughan in the Regional Municipality of York. In 1987, it was redefined to consist of the towns of Aurora, Richmond Hill and Vaughan, and the southern part of the Township of King.

In 1996, it was redefined to consist of the towns of East Gwillimbury, Georgina, and Newmarket, as well as the part of King north of Side Road 18, shedding a portion to create the new riding of Thornhill.

The electoral district was abolished in 2003 when it was redistributed between the electoral districts of Newmarket—Aurora, Oak Ridges—Markham and York—Simcoe.

Members of Parliament

Election results

North Riding of the county of York

York North

|- bgcolor="white"
|align="right" colspan=3|Difference
|align="right"|51,088
|align="right"|45.35
|align="right"|
|- bgcolor="white"
|align="right" colspan=3|Turnout
|align="right"|112,665
|align="right"|
|align="right"|

References

Former federal electoral districts of Ontario
Aurora, Ontario
Federal electoral districts of Toronto
Newmarket, Ontario
Politics of King, Ontario
Politics of Markham, Ontario
Politics of Richmond Hill, Ontario
Politics of Vaughan